These Wicked Streets is the second studio album by American rapper Skull Duggery. It was released on September 8, 1998 via No Limit/Penalty Recordings, making it the rapper's final record for the label. Production was handled by Beats By The Pound, with Master P serving as executive producer. It features guest appearances from Silkk the Shocker, C-Murder, Fiend, Master P, Mo B. Dick, Big Ed, Ghetto Commission, KLC, Mia X, Mr. Serv-On, Mystikal, O'Dell, Shad, Snoop Dogg and Soup Bone. The album peaked at number 21 on the Billboard 200, number 41 on the Heatseekers Albums and number 4 on the Top R&B/Hip-Hop Albums in the United States.

Track listing

Sample credits
Track 2 contains a sample of "I Like It" written by Eldra DeBarge, William DeBarge and Etterlene DeBarge
Track 5 contains a re-play of "Do It ('Til You're Satisfied)" written by Billy Nichols

Charts

References

External links

1998 albums
No Limit Records albums
Skull Duggery (rapper) albums